Stephen Russell, who wrote under the pseudonym The Barefoot Doctor, was a practitioner and teacher of Taoism, its medicine, philosophy, meditation practices and martial arts and manifesting system, or wu wei. He is also known for his work combining personal development with electronic dance music and ran 'conscious' electronic dance music events around the world.

His pseudonym is taken from the barefoot doctor system set up by Mao Zedong in 1960s China, which gave farmers basic medical training to bring health care into rural areas.

Personal life
Russell was born in London, 13 September 1954.  His father, Victor (1930–2003) was a businessman and jazz drummer, and one of Russell's cousins was the saxophonist Stan Getz.

Russell completed his primary education at Holland House in North London, then went to Beechwood Park preparatory school in Hertfordshire. He continued his education at the public school Merchant Taylors' in Moor Park. His initial training comprised studying Aikido at 11. In his teens he switched to studying T'ai chi, one of the three Taoist 'internal martial arts', so called because they rely on following a set of internal principles while in the midst of movement or action.

Russell has three sons, and he has performed on stage with the youngest at several music festivals.

Work and teaching
On leaving full-time education Russell started to travel extensively and began to deepen his study of Taoism. From 1979, he lived for four years with the Taos tribe in New Mexico, where he studied shamanism. During this time, he also trained in the two other Taoist internal martial arts, Hsing I and Baguazhang, as well as Taoist meditation and acupuncture, acupressure, moxibustion, and massage techniques. He returned to London in 1983 where he set up and ran an acupuncture practice for 17 years, as well as facilitating self-help workshops based on using all these techniques as a self-help system.
 
Russell ran a series of music-based events he developed to raise consciousness in a group setting. These were originally called "Drum-Offs" as they relied on each audience member bringing a percussion instrument.

Russell taught baby massage with obstetrician Yehudi Gordon for five years during this time. Additionally he released two albums of relaxation music with Polygram International in 1986 and 1987, called First Orbit and Sundancer respectively.

He wrote twenty one books, including Barefoot Doctor's Handbook for the Urban Warrior, A Spiritual Survival Guide and Pure: A Path to Peace, Power and Prosperity, as well as numerous spoken word CDs and DVDs including Meditate and Tai Chi Short Form. Russell was a weekly columnist for The Observer for five years.

In addition to giving talks, leading workshops and commenting on holistic and spiritual matters, he was also a composer and producer of mood-altering electronic music and played in clubs and at festivals, which ran from 1989 until 2005, and in which the self-help message was conveyed in the music, lyrics and audience participation. Russell was a regular guest on London Live radio, as well as Channel 4's The Big Breakfast. He made a series for BBC UK Style named "Barefoot Doctor" which was broadcast in 2003.

From 2001 until 2003 he created and sold a range of fragrant body products called "Barefoot Doctor's Chi/Qi" and "Barefoot Doctor's Damn Sexy" which were sold in the United Kingdom, France and the United States.

In summer 2009, Russell launched a weekly radio show on Ibiza Global Radio. He also performed live in Ibiza at Bazaar (Santa Gertrudis), and launched "Jewels of Enlightenment", a DVD, CD and book package focusing on the practice and philosophy of Taoism. Russell's main website is Barefoot Doctor World. He had a weekly radio programme on Glastonbury Global Radio. He worked on a record label, PhonicTonic, in collaboration with DJ Mark Holmes, releasing dance and meditation music which was said to heal listeners using various healing tones and frequencies.

Russell was a patron of the charity Last Night a DJ Saved My Life.

Russell travelled the world from 2011, during which time he travelled 350,000 miles and promoted on his Taoist "inner technology" system through a series of talks, residential retreats, "conscious clubbing" events and electronic dance projects.

From 2012, Russell ran a pilot scheme in the mental health sector under the auspices of the Pavilion Mental Health Center in Tottenham, North London. The "Mental Health Ninja" programme is designed to assist people transiting from the mental ward back into the community, by teaching them aspects of the Taoist internal system. In August 2014, Mental Health Ninja was planned to be introduced as part of the National Health Service.

Death
Died 24 January 2020

Controversy
Mainstream medical professionals have criticised the advice given in Russell's popular Observer column as being founded on traditional beliefs rather than science, and his books have been described as "health fiction".

He has been accused of "sexually predatory" behaviour by several women. Jonathan Coe of medical practitioners' standards charity Witness, said that they had received five complaints about Russell relating to patients in treatment. Russell has admitted to having sex with ex-patients.

Selected bibliography 

 Russell, S and Jurgen Kolb (1992) "The Tao of Sexual Massage" : Gaia Books
 Russell, S. (1998) Barefoot Doctor's Handbook for the Urban Warrior : Piatkus : London
 Russell, S. (1999) Barefoot Doctor's Guide to the Tao: A Spiritual Handbook for the Urban Warrior : Three Rivers Press : London
 Russell, S. (1999) Barefoot Doctor's Handbook For Heroes : Piatkus : London
 Russell, S. (2000) Barefoot Doctor's Handbook For Modern Lovers : A Spiritual Guide to Truly Rude and Amazing Love and Sex: Piatkus : London
 Russell, S. (2001) Barefoot Doctor's Handbook for Modern Lovers: A Spiritual Guide to Truly Rude and Amazing Love and Sex : Broadway : New York
 Russell, S. (2001) Return Of The Urban Warrior : Element Books
 Russell, S. (2002) Liberation : Element Books
 Russell, S. (2003) Twisted Fables For Twisted Minds : Element Books
 Russell, S. (2004) Instant Enlightenment : Element Books: London
 Russell, S. (2005) Manifesto London: Element Books
 Russell, S. (2005) Dear Barefoot: The Wisdom of the Barefoot Doctor Atlantic Books: London
 Russell, S. (2006) Invincibility Training : Element Books
 Russell, S. (2008) Pure : Hay House
 Russell, S. (2009) The Man Who Drove With His Eyes Closed : Hay House
 Russell, S. (2009) Jewels of Enlightenment : Nightingale Conant
 Russell, S. (2010) Supercharged Taoist: An Amazing True Story to Inspire You on Your Own Adventure " : Hay House
 Russell, S, (2012) The Message, vision for a new golden era : Imago

References

External links 
 Barefoot Doctor official website
 The Good Web Guide interview with Russell
 Prediction Magazine interview with Russell
 Russell's page on the Cyberspace Health Clinic website
  a 1990 video-short composed by Stephen Russell

British Taoists
Living people
1954 births
Music promoters
Writers from London
20th-century English writers
21st-century English writers